Pericoptus is a genus of large scarab beetles found in New Zealand. As many as five species are recognized.

Species
 Pericoptus frontalis
 Pericoptus nitidulus
 Pericoptus punctatus
 Pericoptus stupidus
 Pericoptus truncatus

References

 https://nzetc.victoria.ac.nz/tm/scholarly/tei-Bio23Tuat01-t1-body-d1.html
 Brown, J. G. (1967). Notes and records of New Zealand Scarabaeidae (Coleoptera). New Zealand Entomologist 3:42–50.
 Crumpton, W. J. (1974). Eugregarines from the larva of the sand scarab (Pericoptus truncatus Fabricius; Scarabaeidae). Journal of the Royal Society of New Zealand 4:319–326.
 Dale, P. S. (1956). The sand scarab, Pericoptus. M.Sc. Thesis, University of Canterbury. New Zealand. 130.
 Dale, P. S. (1963). Ecology, Life History and Redescription of Pericoptus truncatus (Fabricius). Trans. Roy. Soc. N.Z. (Zool.) 3 (3): 17–32.

Dynastinae
Beetles of New Zealand